Kikihia paxillulae, commonly known as Peg's cicada, is a species of cicada that is endemic to New Zealand. This species was first described by Charles Fleming in 1984.

References

Cicadas of New Zealand
Insects described in 1984
Endemic fauna of New Zealand
Cicadettini
Endemic insects of New Zealand